Thomas Peter Meighan (born 11 January 1981) is an English singer and musician, best known as the former lead vocalist for the rock band Kasabian. He enjoyed large-scale success with Kasabian in the 2000s and 2010s. He is said to have an intense, frenetic personality both on and off stage. He has been compared to Liam Gallagher, who he has referred to as the "perfect frontman". Meighan finished 13th in Radio X's poll of the greatest frontmen.

Early life
Thomas Peter Meighan was born on 11 January 1981 in Blaby, Leicestershire, the son of Irish window cleaner Tom Meighan Sr. and nurse Patricia Meighan. He attended Countesthorpe Leysland Community College. He passed Art and English Literature at school, but was ungraded for many other exams after failing to attend them. He enjoyed music ranging from Motown to hip hop, and constantly sang Cypress Hill songs during his youth. He said, "It was a very musical house with Motown and a lot of soul music. That's what I grew up on. It was just a very loving house. It's got a very warm feeling."

Career
Meighan became the lead vocalist of Kasabian at the band's inception in Leicester in 1997. He has sung lead vocals on the majority of the band's recordings, has a baritone vocal range, and did not play any instruments within the group apart from tambourine on occasion and guitar on live renditions of "The Nightworkers" and "Test Transmission".

Meighan has also contributed lead to the songs "Viva La Revolution" by Superevolver, and the Lysergic Suite's "Ghosts on Crusade". He was a guest vocalist on the Dark Horses track "Count Me In", which he performed with that band when they opened for Kasabian on the West Ryder tour. Additionally, he sang backing vocals on the Jersey Budd single "She Came Back". Meighan has also appeared onstage with Zak Starkey's band Penguinsrising.

In 2013, Meighan began a project with rapper Wottee Watnot (Andrew Wattie) called Mic Rockers, described as "a hip hop/rock collaboration". The first video from the duo, "Mic Rockers", was released on 13 November 2013. In addition to the numerous musical awards he shares with the rest of Kasabian, he was named the 19th-best frontman of all time by a Q magazine readers' poll, and 13th-best frontman of all time by a 2012 Xfm listeners' poll.

Meighan took his first acting role in early 2011, as Terry Graham in the sitcom pilot Walk Like a Panther. Reportedly, he had previously rejected offers to appear in Marie Antoinette due to being committed to Kasabian.

On 6 July 2020, it was announced that Meighan was stepping down from Kasabian by mutual consent due to personal issues. The next day, he pleaded guilty to assaulting his ex-fiancée on 9 April 2020.

In October 2020, Meighan announced that he was working on solo projects. A year later, he shared a snippet of a song called "Would You Mind" on his Instagram account, explaining that the song was about "asking for help when you need it the most but can't find the courage to ask." He also added that he had recorded several songs that were "ready to share." On 31 October 2021, "Would You Mind" was released as a free download.

Media image
Meighan also offered more serious critiques of the effects of the Internet upon the music industry, and was one of a number of celebrities to criticize Simon Cowell's handling of Susan Boyle, stating, "It will torture her for the rest of life. She is not ready for it and she is not made for it. She is being manipulated. It's horrible."

As of 2009, Meighan was making an attempt to tone down his controversial image. In an interview with the Daily Record, he said, "When we released the first album, it didn't help in interviews that we slagged everyone off. We were only messing about, we were having fun but everyone took it a little too seriously…We did it for effect but we were portrayed as monsters instead of just a bunch of lads in a band. They got us so wrong. I don't regret anything we said but it was ridiculous."

Meighan has supported numerous charities including Oxfam, UNICEF, and the Teenage Cancer Trust. In support of the latter, he assumed the role of Ace Face in The Who's 2011 benefit performance of Quadrophenia.

Meighan's status as a fashion icon and well-known football fan led him to be chosen to unveil Umbro's England away football jersey in 2010, the first singer ever to do so. He has also modelled for Gio-Goi and Deadly Sins.

Personal life
Meighan has a daughter, Mimi Malone Meighan, with his former girlfriend Kim James. The couple split in 2016.

On 7 July 2020, less than 24 hours after his departure from Kasabian was announced, Meighan pleaded guilty to assaulting his fiancée Vikki Ager. At the time of the trial, prosecutor Naeem Valli said the "sustained assault" had left Ager with bruises on her knees, elbow, and ankle, as well as red marks around her neck. The court was told that Meighan "smelt heavily of intoxicants" as he assaulted Ager. He was ordered to 200 hours of community service.

The following day, Meighan issued a public apology. "I would like to make a statement about recent events and publicly apologise to my partner Vikki, my bandmates, my friends, family and fans. I am very sorry and deeply regret my recent behaviour. In no way am I trying to condone my actions or make excuses. I am completely to blame and accept my responsibility." Meighan said he has been struggling with an alcohol addiction and was diagnosed with ADHD, commenting: "The incident in April was a wake-up call for me, for who I was, and what I was becoming. I was spiralling out of control. My mental health was becoming more and more unstable and I was at breaking point."

Meighan said he left rehab three weeks prior and was intent on staying sober. He added his ADHD diagnosis does not excuse his behaviour, but it has helped him to understand more about his "behavioural issues". The musician concluded the post by assuring his fans the assault was an isolated incident, adding: "Vikki and I are still very much in love and we are looking forward to rebuilding our life together with the support of those close to us."

Meighan married Vikki Ager on 13 July 2021, one year after pleading guilty to attacking her.

Discography

Singles
 "Would You Mind" (2021)
 "Moving On" / "Out of This World" (2022)
 "Let It Ride" / "Icarus" (2022)

References

External links

People from Leicester
English male singers
English rock singers
English people of Irish descent
1981 births
Living people
Kasabian members
Musicians from Leicestershire
English people convicted of assault